AWK is an interpreted programming language designed for text processing and typically used as a data extraction and reporting tool.

AWK or awk may also refer to:

 Adwick railway station (National Rail code), UK
 American Water Works, US and Canada, NYSE symbol
 Wake Island Airfield, IATA code
 Awabakal language (ISO 639-3 language code)

See also
 AUK (disambiguation)